Iñigo Cervantes-Huegun was the defender of title, but he was eliminated after retired in first round match against Andrey Kuznetsov.
Ivan Sergeyev defeated Marek Semjan 7–6(2), 6–1 in the final.

Seeds

Draw

Finals

Top half

Bottom half

References
 Main Draw
 Qualifying Draw

Mordovia Cup - Singles
Mordovia Cup
2010 in Russian tennis